FireForce is the name of a series of jet-powered cars that have been produced since 1989. The first four cars, FireForce 1, FireForce 2, FireForce 3, and FireForce 4, are jet-powered funny cars. The fifth car, known as FireForce 5, is a jet-propelled dragster.

References

Jet cars
Cars of England